Habton is a civil parish in the Ryedale district of North Yorkshire, England. In 2011, it had a population of 321.

History 
The name "Habton" means 'Hab(b)a's farm/settlement'. Both Great and Little Habton was recorded in the Domesday Book as Abbetune/Abetune/Habetun. Both Habtons and Ryton were formerly townships in the parish of Kirby Misperton, from 1866, the three hamlets were civil parishes in their own right, on 1 April 1986 the parishes of Great Habton, Little Habton and Ryton were abolished and merged to form Habton.

References

Civil parishes in North Yorkshire
Ryedale